In the Barber Shop is a 1908 French short silent film by Georges Méliès. It was sold by Méliès's Star Film Company and is numbered 1102–1103 in its catalogues.

Two of Méliès's frequent collaborators appear in the film: Fernande Albany as the plump client, and Manuel as one of the barbers. The film's special effects are created with substitution splices. The film appears to have been inspired by a 1906 Pathé film in which a Black man uses bootblack to darken the face of a woman who mocks him. The Black character in Méliès's film is played as a pejorative caricature, typifying the stereotypical figure of the dandy nègre ("Black dandy") that frequently appeared in turn-of-the-century French imagery. There may also be some influence from American minstrel shows.

In a study of otherness in popular entertainment, French writer Enrique Seknadje comments that the film perpetuates racist stereotyping by associating erotic desire with Blackness, but also that the woman's anger seems to imply a criticism of society's casual racism.

References

External links
 

French black-and-white films
Films directed by Georges Méliès
French silent short films